Charles Kincheloe "Kirk" Stuart (April 13, 1934, Charleston, West Virginia - December 17, 1982) was an American jazz pianist and educator.

Stuart studied at a conservatory before accompanying singers such as Billie Holiday (1956), Della Reese (1957–59), and Sarah Vaughan (1961–63). He also arranged and conducted for these singers. He led his own unit in Los Angeles later in the 1960s, and recorded with Al Grey in 1965 and once more with Reese in 1967. In later years he taught at Howard University and the Texas Southern University Jazz Ensemble, led ensembles in Las Vegas, and accompanied Joe Williams at the Smithsonian Institution in 1982. Later that year he died during surgery on his spleen.

Discography

With Al Grey 
Shades of Grey (Tangerine, 1965)
With Sarah Vaughan 
Sassy Swings The Tivoli (1963)

References
"Kirk Stuart", Grove Jazz online.

Further reading
Leonard Feather, The Encyclopedia of Jazz in the Sixties.
Obituary, Jazz Times, March 1983, p. 8.

1934 births
1982 deaths
American jazz pianists
American male pianists
Educators from West Virginia
Musicians from Charleston, West Virginia
Howard University faculty
20th-century American pianists
20th-century American male musicians
American male jazz musicians